The Bridgewater Triangle is an area of about  within southeastern Massachusetts in the United States, claimed to be a site of alleged paranormal phenomena, ranging from UFOs to poltergeists, orbs, balls of fire and other spectral phenomena, various bigfoot-like sightings, giant snakes and thunderbirds. The term was coined by New England based cryptozoologist Loren Coleman.

Location 
Specific boundaries of the Bridgewater Triangle were first described by cryptozoologist Loren Coleman who coined the term in the 1970s, and later in his book Mysterious America.

Historic places and landmarks 

Hockomock Swamp - Central to the area is Hockomock Swamp, which means "the place where spirits dwell." English colonizers called it "Devil's Swamp". Alleged sightings reported here include various flying creatures and ghosts.
Freetown-Fall River State Forest - The Freetown-Fall River State Forest has reportedly been the site of various cult activity including animal sacrifice, ritualistic murders committed by admitted Satanists, as well as a number of gangland murders and a number of suicides.
Profile Rock - The supposed site of where Wampanoag historical figure Anawan received the lost wampum belt from Philip, legend has it the ghost of a man can be seen sitting on the rock with his legs crossed or with outstretched arms. Located within the Freetown-Fall River State Forest.
Solitude Stone - An inscribed stone located near Forest Street in West Bridgewater which was found near a missing person's body. Also known as "suicide stone," the rock was found with the inscription: "All ye, who in future days, Walk by Nunckatessett stream Love not him who hummed his lay Cheerful to the parting beam, But the beauty that he wooed."
Bridgewater State University - Several buildings and rooms on campus are alleged to be haunted by ghosts and other paranormal phenomena.
Taunton State Hospital - Some visitors have claimed that they had strange paranormal experiences in the hospital including being touched and pulled in certain areas of the hospital. It is also claimed that the hospital was used by satanic cults during the 1960s and 70s.
Hornbine School - The one-room schoolhouse was built during the 1840s and remained in active use until 1937. The building is alleged to be haunted by its former inhabitants.

Paranormal claims 
Common to most of these areas is a mix of reported phenomena, that includes reports of:
Unidentified flying objects, often in the form of bright balls of light or large, unusual spacecraft.
Unnatural animal sightings, ranging from unusual reports of animals that are not found within the area (such as panthers and bears) to more supernatural claims of giant snakes and enormous vicious dogs.
Paranormal humanoids, including sightings of Bigfoot, ghosts, poltergeists, and shadow people.
Thunderbird sightings: Giant birds or pterodactyl-like flying creature with wingspans up to twelve feet are claimed to have been seen in Hockomock Swamp and neighboring Taunton and Easton, including a report by Norton Police Sergeant Thomas Downy.
Cult activity, especially animal mutilations: Various incidents of animal mutilation have been reported, particularly in Freetown and Fall River, where local police were called to investigate mutilated animals believed to be the work of a cult. Two specific incidents in 1998 were reported: one in which a single adult cow was found butchered in the woods; the other in which a group of calves were discovered in a clearing, grotesquely mutilated as if part of a ritual sacrifice.
Native American curses: According to one tale, Native Americans had cursed the swamp centuries ago because of conflict with Colonial settlers. A revered object of the Wampanoag people, a belt known as the wampum belt, was lost during King Philip's War. Legend says that the area owes its paranormal unrest to the fact that this belt was lost from the Native people.
Pukwudgie: A creature from Algonquian folklore. The local Wampanoag people consider them to be dangerous tricksters. They have been especially associated with the Freetown State Forest within the Bridgewater Triangle.

See also
Lovecraft Country
Pukwudgie

References

Further reading 

Paranormal
Cryptozoology
Paranormal triangles
Unidentified flying objects
Bridgewater, Massachusetts
Paranormal places in the United States
Reportedly haunted locations in Massachusetts
Earth mysteries
Forteana